The Art Workers' Coalition (AWC) was an open coalition of artists, filmmakers, writers, critics, and museum staff that formed in New York City in January 1969. Its principal aim was to pressure the city's museums – notably the Museum of Modern Art – into implementing economic and political reforms. These included a more open and less exclusive exhibition policy concerning the artists they exhibited and promoted: the absence of women artists and artists of color was a principal issue of contention, which led to the formation of Women Artists in Revolution (WAR) in 1969. The coalition successfully pressured the MoMA and other museums into implementing a free admission day that still exists in certain museums to this day. It also pressured and picketed museums into taking a moral stance on the Vietnam War which resulted in its famous My Lai poster And babies, one of the most important works of political art of the early 1970s. The poster was displayed during demonstrations in front of Pablo Picasso′s Guernica at the MoMA in 1970.

Origins

The AWC grew out of an incident at MoMA during the exhibition curated by Pontus Hulten, The Machine at the End of the Mechanical Age. On January 3, 1969, Greek kinetic sculptor Takis, with the support of friends, physically removed his work from the exhibition. Although the work, Tele-sculpture (1960), had been purchased by the MoMA in 1963 and thus belonged to its permanent collection, Takis was unhappy with the museum's lack of consultation in choosing a work for exhibition which he considered no longer adequately represented his current artistic practice. The artist took his work into the museum's sculpture garden and remained there until he received confirmation from museum officials that his work would be withdrawn from the exhibition. The incident led to a series of meetings held at the Chelsea Hotel in which the group that had supported Takis's action discussed issues relating to the political and social responsibility of the art community.  The group included Takis, American kinetic sculptor Wen-Ying Tsai, German conceptual artist Hans Haacke, American writer and independent curator Willoughby Sharp, co-founder of Avalanche Liza Bear, American artist and Village Voice art critic John Perreault, and American minimalist artist Carl Andre. On January 28, 1969, the AWC presented MoMa's director Bates Lowry with a list of 13 demands. 

In 1970, AWC organized an art strike to condemn the death of university students killed by police during Vietnam War protests.

13 Demands 
The 13 Demands that AWC submitted to Lowry were as follows:

 The Museum should hold a public hearing during February on the topic "The Museum's Relationship to Artists and to Society", which should conform to the recognized rules of procedure for public hearings. 
 A section of the Museum, under the direction of black artists, should be devoted to showing the accomplishments of Black artists. 
 The Museum's activities should be extended into the Black, Spanish and other communities. It should also encourage exhibits with which these groups can identify. 
 A committee of artists with curatorial responsibilities should be set up annually to arrange exhibits. 
 The Museum should be open on two evenings until midnight and admission should be free at all times. 
 Artists should be paid a rental fee for the exhibition of their works. 
 The Museum should recognize an artist's right to refuse showing a work owned by the Museum in any exhibition other than one of the Museum's permanent collection. 
 The Museum should declare its position on copyright legislation and the proposed arts proceeds act. It should also take active steps to inform artists of their legal rights. 
 A registry of artists should be instituted at the Museum. Artists who wish to be registered should supply the Museum with documentation of their work, in the form of photographs, news clippings, etc., and this material should be added to the existing artists' files. 
 The Museum should exhibit experimental works requiring unique environmental conditions at locations outside the Museum. 
 A section of the Museum should be permanently devoted to showing the works of artists without galleries. 
 The Museum should include among its staff persons qualified to handle the installation and maintenance of technological works. 
 The Museum should appoint a responsible person to handle any grievances arising from its dealings with artists.

Subsequent Activities

Upon receiving AWC's 13 Demands, MoMA met and held a dialogue with artist representatives from AWC that was publicly acknowledged. Lowry and MoMA, however, refused to meet all of the specific demands of the AWC, such as the demand to hold a public hearing on the topic "The Museum's Relationship to Artists and to Society". After organizing a number of demonstrations in front of the museum, the group held an open hearing at the New York School of Visual Arts on 10 April 1969. The event was retitled "What Should Be the Program of The Art Workers Regarding Museum Reform, and to Establish the Program of the Art Workers' Coalition." Some three hundred artists and members of the New York art community attended the hearing. The initial demands that had been made to the MoMA were debated within the larger group that formed during the open hearing, and later refined and addressed to all New York Museums. Artists and critics subsequently debated various subjects of contention including artists' rights, museum policy and broader political issues including the Vietnam War. On 15 October 1969, the AWC organized a successful "Moratorium of Art to End the War in Vietnam." The MoMA, the Whitney Museum, the Jewish Museum and a large number of commercial art galleries closed for the day. The Metropolitan Museum and the Guggenheim Museum did not comply, although, under pressure from the AWC, the Metropolitan did postpone the opening of its American painting and sculpture show scheduled for that day, while the Guggenheim was picketed. The coalition's activities eventually led to changes in how museums interact with artists, a contribution to the art world that is considered lasting in spite of the coalition's short three-year existence. The AWC ceased its activities at the end of 1971.

Notable former members

Carl Andre
Frederick Castle
Bahman Farman (visual artist, graphic designer, graffiti artist)
Leon Golub
Dan Graham
Hans Haacke
Jon Hendricks
Frank Hewitt
Leandro Katz
David Lee
Naomi Levine
Lucy Lippard
Lee Lozano
Len Lye
Howardena Pindell
Irving Petlin
Faith Ringgold
Tony Shafrazi
Seth Siegelaub
Nancy Spero
Takis
Wen-Ying Tsai
Hollis Frampton
Gregory Battcock
Ken Jacobs
Judy Walenta (MOMA registrar)
Alan Vega

References

1. http://nvdatabase.swarthmore.edu/content/art-workers-coalition-demonstrates-artists-rights-1969 

2. http://primaryinformation.org/files/FOH.pdf

3.  http://www.leftmatrix.com/artworkerscolist.html

4. Artwords: Discourse on the 60s and 70s. Page 121, by Jeanne Seigal

5. Kill for Peace: American Artists Against the Vietnam War. By Matthew Israel 

6. The Power of Display: A History of Exhibition Installations at the Museum of Modern Art. Mary Anne Staniszewski MIT Press, 1998 - Art - 371 pages, p. 108

Further reading
Art Workers Coalition 'Open Hearing' and 'Documents' online
Francis Frascina, "Meyer Schapiro's Choice: My Lai, Guernica, MoMA and the Art Left, 1969-70", Journal of Contemporary History, Vol. 30, No. 3. (Jul., 1995), pp. 481–511 and Vol. 30 No. 4 (Oct., 1995), pp. 705–728.
Julia Bryan-Wilson, Art Workers: Radical Practice in the Vietnam War Era, (Berkeley, Los Angeles, London: University of California Press, 2009).
Alan W. Moore, “Artists’ Collectives: Focus on New York, 1975–2000,” in Collectivism after Modernism: The Art of Social Imagination after 1945, ed. Blake Stimson and Greg Sholette (Minneapolis: University of Minnesota Press, 2007), 192–221.
Kirsten Forkert, "The Art Workers Coalition (revisited): a call to participate", Journal of Aesthetics and Protest, 5.
Sonia S. Braga, "Art Workers Coalition", Anima e Terra, No.1, April, 2012, pp. 246–274 (Italian).

1969 establishments in New York City
1971 disestablishments in New York (state)
Arts organizations established in 1969
Arts organizations disestablished in the 20th century
Organizations disestablished in 1971
American artist groups and collectives
Arts organizations based in New York City

Documentation of Judy Walenta as a registrar at MOMA to explain inclusion in the list:
[PDF]Hector Guimard - MoMA

https://www.moma.org/.../MOMA_1970_Jan-Jun...

Museum of Modern Art
sening of technical limitations and the waning influence of the machine-age aesthetics of the Bauhaus. ... of his buildings. The exhibition is divided into a series of galleries holding furniture and objects .... York; The Museum of Modern Art, New York; Archives de Paris ... and Judy Walenta for skillful registration;  Full article web citation: https://www.moma.org/momaorg/shared/pdfs/docs/press_archives/4430/releases/MOMA_1970_Jan-June_0027_27.pdf?2010